Commander John Pender Paynter R.N. (1788–1856) of Trekenning House, St Columb Major, Cornwall, was an officer of the British Royal Navy noted for his services during the Napoleonic Wars. In 1815 Paynter was appointed Flag Lieutenant to Lord Exmouth on HMS Boyne. In 1816 during the Bombardment of Algiers, Paynter was sent ashore in an attempt to secure the release of Christian slaves and to demand the release from custody of a Colonel Macdonald, the English Consul but was himself seized by the Dey and lodged in the Black Hole. However, the menacing attitude assumed by the British Fleet assured his release.

Naval career
In 1814 Lieutenant Paynter proceeded to America and was present at the capture of Fort Washington and the capitulation of Alexandria up the Patuxent:  On his return to England in 1816, Paynter was advanced to commander.

See also

References 

Royal Navy officers
1788 births
1856 deaths
Royal Navy personnel of the French Revolutionary Wars
Royal Navy personnel of the Napoleonic Wars
Sailors from Cornwall
Royal Navy personnel of the Bombardment of Algiers (1816)
Royal Navy personnel of the War of 1812